Hamilton is a 1917 Broadway play about Alexander Hamilton, written by Mary P. Hamlin and George Arliss. It was directed by Dudley Digges and starred Arliss in the title role. It follows the attempts of Hamilton to establish a new financial structure for the United States following the Confederation Period and the establishment of a new Constitution in 1787.

Mary Hamlin, then a 46-year-old high society woman and mother of four, claimed that playwriting was her "secret desire."

In 1931, the film Alexander Hamilton was released. It was based on Hamlin's play and Arliss reprised the title role.

Cast
 George Arliss as Alexander Hamilton 
 Carl Anthony as Thomas Jefferson
 Hardee Kirkland as James Monroe
 John D. Ravold as William B. Giles
 George Woodward  as General Philip Schuyler 
 Guy Favieres as  Count Talleyrand
 Pell Trenton as James Reynolds
 James O. Barrows as Zekial
 Wilson Day as Chief Justice John Jay
 Harry Maitland as Colonel Lear
 C.M. Van Clief as Citizen
 Florence Arliss as Mrs. Betsy Hamilton
 Marion Barney  as Angelica Church
 Jeanne Eagels as Mrs. Maria Reynolds
 Gillian Scaife as Mrs. Zachery Whalen

Reception
Hamilton opened to positive reviews on Broadway. A review in the New York Post read, "Congratulations are due to Mary Hamlin and George Arliss upon the cordial public reception accorded to their play 'Hamilton,' upon the occasion of its first production in this city ... The piece is a welcome and, in some respects, notable addition to the small body of genuine American drama. ... it is a real play with real men and women in it, containing an appeal not only to popular taste, but to the attention of the intelligent theatergoer."

References

External links

 Hamilton at the Internet Broadway Database

1917 plays
Plays set in the United States
Plays set in France
Plays based on real people
Plays set in the 18th century
American plays adapted into films
Cultural depictions of Alexander Hamilton
Cultural depictions of Thomas Jefferson
Cultural depictions of James Monroe
Cultural depictions of Charles Maurice de Talleyrand-Périgord